The Master of Performing Arts (M.P.A. or M.Perf.A.) is a graduate degree awarded in the fields of dance, drama, film and music. The degree generally requires a minimum of two years of full-time study to complete. The degree program is offered primarily in Asia, and was formerly offered in the United States of America, where it has been supplanted by the more prevalent Master of Fine Arts, Master of Music and Master of Arts in Performing Arts degrees.

Asia 

Institutions presently offering a Master of Performing Arts program include:

Bangladesh 

Rajshahi University

India 

Dr. Hari Singh Gour University
Banaras Hindu University
Bhatkhande Music Institute
Bharathidasan University
Indira Gandhi National Open University
Lovely Professional University
University of Hyderabad

Malaysia 

University of Malaya

Europe

Italy 

In the Italian higher education system, the various Academies of Fine Arts offer second level programs that lead to a "Diploma Accademico di Secondo Livello in Arti Visive e Discipline dello Spettacolo" which translates to "Masters in Visual and Performing Arts". The degree bears this name regardless of whether the discipline studied was in the Visual Arts or the Performing Arts. This credential is thus equivalent if the discipline studied was a Performing Arts discipline.

United States 

Institutions that formerly granted the Master of Performing Arts degree include:

California

University of Southern California

Louisiana 

University of New Orleans

Massachusetts 

Emerson College

Oklahoma 

Oklahoma City University

References 

Master's degrees
Performing arts education